Virginia's 32nd Senate district is one of 40 districts in the Senate of Virginia. It has been represented by Democrat Janet Howell since 1992.

Geography
District 32 is based in Fairfax County in the suburbs of Washington D.C., including some or all of Reston, Oak Hill, Franklin Farm, Wolf Trap, Tysons, McLean, and Pimmit Hills; the district also takes in a small portion of Arlington County.

Recent election results

2019

2015

2011

Federal and statewide results in District 32

Historical results
All election results below took place prior to 2011 redistricting, and thus were under different district lines.

2007

2003

1999

1995

References

Virginia Senate districts
Arlington County, Virginia
Government in Fairfax County, Virginia